Thomas Hagan Roberts (January 4, 1902 – January 7, 1976) was an American attorney and jurist who served as a judge on the United States District Court for the District of Puerto Rico and Rhode Island Supreme Court.

Early life and education
Born in Providence, Rhode Island, Roberts received his bachelor's degree from Fordham University and his J.D. degree from Boston University School of Law. During World War II, he served as director of Rhode Island Civil Defense and chairman of the Rhode Island Bureau of Police and Fire.

Career 
From 1949 to 1950, Roberts served as chief counsel of the United Nations War Crimes Commission. Roberts was appointed to the judgeship for the United States District Court for the District of Puerto Rico, by President Harry S. Truman, and served from 1950 to 1952. Roberts served on the Rhode Island Superior Court in 1951 and was appointed to succeed Justice Jeremiah E. O'Connell on the Rhode Island Supreme Court in 1956,<ref name="Vacancies">"Andrews, Roberts, Paolino Named To Three Vacancies On State Supreme Court", Newport Daily News (January 18, 1956), p. 1.</ref> serving until 1976, and as chief justice from 1966 to 1976.  He was the brother of Rhode Island Governor Dennis J. Roberts.

References

Guillermo A. Baralt, History of the Federal Court in Puerto Rico: 1899-1999 (2004) (also published in Spanish as Historia del Tribunal Federal de Puerto Rico'')

1902 births
1976 deaths
Lawyers from Providence, Rhode Island
Fordham University alumni
Boston University School of Law alumni
Chief Justices of the Rhode Island Supreme Court
Judges of the United States District Court for the District of Puerto Rico
United States Article I federal judges appointed by Harry S. Truman
20th-century American judges
Politicians from Providence, Rhode Island